Robert Calvert (1945–1988) was a South African-born English musician and writer.

Robert Calvert may also refer to:

 Robert Calvert (saxophonist), English saxophonist
 Robert S. Calvert (1892–1981), Texas comptroller, 1949–1975
 Robert W. Calvert (1905–1994), Texas politician and judge